Meghna Naidu (born 19 September 1980) is an Indian actress who primarily starred in Hindi films. She has also appeared in Telugu, Tamil, Kannada, Malayalam, Marathi and Bengali films.

Biography

Meghna Naidu is an Indian actress and dancer. Her first major appearance was in the music video for UMI10's "Kaliyon Ka Chaman" (2002), an official remix of Lata Mangeshkar's 1981 song "Thoda Resham Lagta Hai" (in turn, the 2002 song "Addictive" by Truth Hurts was inspired by the remix). She was also featured in Saru Maini's video "Dil De Diya Tha (Sutta Mix)" before starting to work in Indian films.

Early life
Naidu was born on 19 September 1980 in Vijayawada, Andhra Pradesh, India. Her father Ethiraj works for Air India and was a tennis coach and her mother Purnima, was a school teacher. She has one younger sister, Sona. She told that she requested her mother to quit her job and accompany her to shooting locations, after her sister who used to travel with her got a job abroad. She grew up in Mumbai, Maharashtra, and considers herself "more of a Mumbaiite". She studied at Bhavan's College, Andheri, Mumbai, and graduated with a B.Com degree. She trained in classical bharatanatyam for seven years. She stated that she also was coaching tennis in the US for four years.

Career
At the age of 18, she met a model co-ordinator at the wedding of her cousin in Chennai, who called her for a screen test for a feature film. She secured a role in the Telugu film Prema Sakshi (1999), following which she appeared in one more Telugu and two Kannada films. She then appeared in UMI10's music video "Kaliyon Ka Chaman", directed by Radhika Rao and Vinay Sapru, which she says happened by accident. She was accompanying her friend to the audition for the video, when she was approached by the team. She was asked to send in her photographs and within few days, she was selected for the video. "Kaliyon Ka Chaman" became a grand success and gained her recognition. She subsequently went on to do many stage performances in and outside of India.

She made her Bollywood debut with the B-grade film Hawas (2004), which dealt with extramarital affair. It was followed by lead roles in Classic Dance of Love (2005), which featured her as a dancer, and Rain: The Terror Within... (2005), in which she played a blind author. In Mashooka, she played a character with negative shades. In her latter career, she mostly made special appearances in item numbers in South Indian films.

She also participated in the television shows Fear Factor - Khatron Ke Khiladi and Dancing Queen. She played the role of Benazir in the TV series, Jodha Akbar.

Personal life
Naidu started a relationship with tennis player Luis Miguel Reis in 2011 and married him on 12 December 2016. She resides in Dubai with her husband and travels to India for work.

Filmography

Television shows
 Fear Factor: Khatron Ke Khiladi 1 on Colors TV 
 Dancing Queen on Colors TV 
 Jodha Akbar on Zee TV 
 MTV Fanaah on MTV India 
 Adaalat on Sony Entertainment Television 
 Sasural Simar Ka on Colors 
  Maharakshak Aryan  on Zee TV

References

External links

 
 
 
 

Living people
Actresses in Hindi cinema
Actresses in Tamil cinema
Actresses in Telugu cinema
Actresses in Malayalam cinema
Actresses in Bengali cinema
Actresses in Kannada cinema
Actresses in Telugu television
Indian television actresses
Indian film actresses
21st-century Indian actresses
1982 births
Actresses from Vijayawada
Musicians from Vijayawada
Singers from Andhra Pradesh
Fear Factor: Khatron Ke Khiladi participants